Jerry Louis (born 12 February 1978 in Mauritius) is a football player who currently plays for Trois Bassins FC in Réunion as a midfielder. He has also represented Mauritius internationally with the Mauritius national football team. He is featured on the Mauritian national team in the official 2010 FIFA World Cup video game.

References 

1978 births
Living people
Mauritius international footballers
Mauritian footballers
Mauritian expatriate footballers
Expatriate footballers in Réunion
Mauritian expatriate sportspeople in Réunion
Mauritian Premier League players
Curepipe Starlight SC players
Association football midfielders